Sketchy Queens is an American sketch comedy television series premiered on WOW Presents Plus on September 15, 2022. It marks the streaming service's first sketch comedy original programming. The series stars Jinkx Monsoon and Liam Krug in various sketches. The series also included guest appearances, such as Trixie Mattel, Brandon Rogers, and Brittany Broski.

In November 2022, the production company, World of Wonder, announced that the show has been renewed for a second season.

Background 
The series was announced by World of Wonder's streaming platform, WOW Presents Plus, its fall lineup filled with many original programming series to debut. A trailer for WOW Presents Plus' fall lineup revealed the comedy show was set to be released on September 15, 2022. In November 2022, the comedy show was renewed for a second season.

Format

Sunrise Boulevard 
Liam Krug bumps into Jinkx Monsoon on Sunrise Boulevard (Portland, Oregon), where they are trying to revitalize Monsoon's career into the modern world.

Sonoma Public Access 
Winderly Landchime and Bethany Christmas bought a bankrupted public-access television station.

I See You and I Hear You: Winderly Landchime and Bethany Christmas interview many special guests.

Episodes

Season 1 (2022)

References 

2020s American television series
WOW Presents Plus original programming